is a passenger railway station in the city of Isesaki, Gunma, Japan, operated by the private railway operator Tōbu Railway.

Lines

Station layout
The station has consists of two offset opposed side platforms, connected to the station building by a footbridge.

Platforms

Adjacent stations

History
Sakaimachi Station opened on 27 March 1910.

From 17 March 2012, station numbering was introduced on all Tōbu lines, with Sakaimachi Station becoming "TI-22".

Passenger statistics
In fiscal 2019, the station was used by an average of 1569 passengers daily (boarding passengers only).

Surrounding area
Isesaki City Library
Isesaki City Gymnasium
Sakaimachi Post Office

See also
List of railway stations in Japan

References

External links

 Tobu station information 

Railway stations in Gunma Prefecture
Tobu Isesaki Line
Stations of Tobu Railway
Railway stations in Japan opened in 1910
Isesaki, Gunma